Kyan is both a surname and a given name. Meaning ancient or enduring. It is an alternative spelling of the given name Kian, which is a variant of ancient Irish Cian. Kyanna is a derivative of this irish name. Notable people with the name include:

Surname 
 Anselan O Kyan, 11th-century Irish nobleman
 Chōtoku Kyan (1870–1945), Japanese karate master
 John Howard Kyan (1774–1850), Irish inventor of the 'kyanising' process for preserving wood

Given name 
 Kyan Douglas (born 1970), American actor
 Kyan Khojandi (born 1982), French comedian, actor and director
 Kyanna Delrio, a dateable character in the dating simulation videogame HuniePop

See also 
 
 
 Cian a figure in Irish mythology

References 

English masculine given names